Materials Studio is software for simulating and modeling materials. It is developed and distributed by BIOVIA (formerly Accelrys), a firm specializing in research software for computational chemistry, bioinformatics, cheminformatics, molecular dynamics simulation, and quantum mechanics.

This software is used in advanced research of various materials, such as polymers, carbon nanotubes, catalysts, metals, ceramics, and so on, by universities (e.g., North Dakota State University), research centers, and high tech companies.

Materials Studio is a client–server model software package with Microsoft Windows-based PC clients and Windows and Linux-based servers running on PCs, Linux IA-64 workstations (including Silicon Graphics (SGI) Altix) and HP XC clusters.

Software components
Analytical and Crystallization: to investigate, predict, and modify crystal structure and crystal growth.
Morphology
Polymorph Predictor
Reflex, Reflex Plus, Reflex QPA: to assist the interpretation of diffraction data for determination of crystallic structure, to validate the results of experiment and computation.
X-Cell: indexing  for medium- to high-quality powder diffraction data from X-ray, neutron, and electron radiation sources.
Quantum and Catalysis
Adsorption Locator: to find the most stable adsorption sites for various materials, including zeolites, carbon nanotubes, silica gel, and activated carbon
CASTEP: to predict electronic, optical, and structural properties
ONETEP: to perform linear-scaling density functional theory simulations
DMol3: quantum mechanical methods to predict materials properties
Sorption: to predict fundamental properties, such as sorption isotherms (or loading curves) and Henry's constants
VAMP: high-speed calculation of a variety of physical and chemical molecular properties, e.g., for quick screening during drug discovery
QSAR, QSAR Plus: to identify compounds with optimal physicochemical properties.
Polymers and Classical Simulation: to construct and characterize models of isolated chains or bulk polymers and predict their properties
Materials Component Collection
Materials Visualizer

Basic workflow
Materials Visualizer is used to construct/import graphical models of materials
Accurate structure is determined by  quantum mechanical, semi-empirical, or classical simulation
Various required properties may be predicted/analyzed

See also 
 Quantum chemistry computer programs
 Comparison of software for molecular mechanics modeling
 Molecular design software
 List of software for Monte Carlo molecular modeling
 List of software for nanostructures modeling

References

Computational chemistry software
Simulation software